Port-de-Piles is a commune in the Vienne department and the Nouvelle-Aquitaine region, western France.

Demographics

See also
Communes of the Vienne department

References

Communes of Vienne